Duty After School is an upcoming South Korean streaming series starring Shin Hyun-soo, Lee Soon-won, Im Se-mi, Kim Ki-hae, Choi Moon-hee, Kim Su-gyeom, Lee Yeon, Kwon Eun-bin, Moon Sang-min, and Woo Min-gyu round out the ensemble cast. Based on the web novel of the same name by Ha Il-kwon, it will premiere on TVING on March 31, 2023, and will air every Friday. It will also available for streaming on Viu in selected regions.

Synopsis 
Duty After School tells about the story of seniors at Seongjin High who started a 'real war', not a war for entrance exams, to fight against the attack of a mysterious creature that covered the sky. Earth is on the verge of an apocalypse due to the invasion of an unidentified sphere, and the desperate struggle of teenagers holding 'guns' instead of 'pens' unfolds hotly in the worst situation ever.

Cast

Main 
 Shin Hyun-soo as Lee Chun-ho, a platoon commander who values military law, he is firm with students and cares for the children more than anyone else.
 Lee Soon-won as Kim Won-bin, a sergeant who is a faithful assistant to Chun-ho.
 Im Se-mi as Park Eun-young, the homeroom teacher of class 2–3 who prioritizes students' safety.
  as Kim Chi-yeol, a student of class 2–3 with a timid and introverted character who has no special dreams or desired colleges.
  as Lee Na-ra, a student of class 2–3 who is full of mystery.
  as Kwon Il-ha, a troublemaker student of class 2–3 and who do whatever he wants.
 Lee Yeon as Noh Ae-seol, a student of class 2–3 who is quiet and rarely gets along with her friends.
 Kwon Eun-bin as Yeon Bo-ra, a student of class 2–3 with an easy-going and hot-tempered personality.
 Moon Sang-min as Wang Tae-man, the mood maker student of class 2–3.
 Woo Min-gyu as Kim Deok-jung, a military virtuoso of class 2–3.

Supporting 
  as Cha So-yeon, a student of class 2–3.
 Ahn Do-gyu as Kook Yeong-su, a student of class 2–3 who create a conflict with his classmates with his selfish appearance of worrying about his safety even at a time of crisis as a 'shop-obsessed man' who thinks that every minute and every second other than studying is a luxury.
  as Kim Yu-jeong, the class president of class 2–3 who tries to make rational decisions even in confusing situations.
 Kim Min-chul as Do Soo-cheol
 Kim Jung-lan
 Hong Sa-bin
 Hwang Se-in as Yu Ha-na
 Kim So-hee as Lee Soon-yi
 Ji Min-hyuk as Jo Hyeong-shin, a student of class 2–3 who can escapes crisis by calmly and quickly grasping the situation.
 
 Shin Hye-ji as Choi Yeon-ju, a student who shows an unexpected wit in the midst of war with her kind and altruistic personality who silently takes care of her friends.
 Oh Se-eun as Hong Jun-hee, the 'professional complainer' student of class 2–3 who is selfish and stubborn and becomes a tension factor in the war.
  as Im Woo-taek, a senior high holding a gun instead of a pen 50 days before the exam.
 Ahn Da-eun as Kim In-hye
 Noh Jong-hyun

Production 
Filming began in August 2021.

In February 2023, the cast lineup and the release date of the series were revealed.

Release 
On March 8, 2023, it was confirmed that the first three episodes will release at once on the 31st.

References

External links 
  
 
 
 Duty After School at Naver TV
 Duty After School at Naver Webtoon

TVING original programming
Korean-language television shows
2023 South Korean television series debuts
South Korean military television series
South Korean science fiction television series
South Korean action television series
South Korean thriller television series
South Korean high school television series
South Korean teen dramas
South Korean drama web series
Television shows based on South Korean webtoons
Television series about teenagers
Television series by Studio Dragon
Upcoming television series